This is a list of awards and nominations received by VIXX, a six-member South Korean boy band, formed by Jellyfish Entertainment. They started to gain recognition in 2013, a year after their debut, releasing a single album, an EP, a repackaged EP and finally, a full-length album. VIXX debuted new material on a quarterly basis during that year, finally winning their first music show award with "Voodoo Doll" in Music Bank. VIXX have been recipients of 22 awards from South Korea and International events. VIXX also received 30 wins on South Korea's televised music programs.

Korean

Golden Disc Awards

Mnet Asian Music Awards

SBS MTV Best of the Best

Seoul Music Awards

Gaon Chart Music Awards

Asia Artist Awards

Korean Entertainment Arts Awards

Soribada Best K-Music Awards

Melon Music Awards

Interpark Awards

Chinese

YinYueTai V Chart Awards

China Music Awards

Japanese

Japan Gold Disc Awards

KMF Awards

International

MTV Europe Music Awards

Other awards

See also

Notes

References

Awards
VIXX